Christ on the Mount of Olives may refer to:

 Christ on the Mount of Olives (Caravaggio), a painting by Caravaggio
 Christ on the Mount of Olives (Paul Gauguin), a painting by Paul Gauguin
 Christ on the Mount of Olives (Beethoven), an oratorio by Beethoven

See also
 Mount of Olives, a mountain ridge east of Jerusalem
 Sermon on the Mount, a sermon given by Jesus Christ while on the Mount of Beatitudes, probably somewhere in Galilee